The Diocese of Urgell is a diocese in Catalonia (Spain) and Andorra in the historical County of Urgell, with origins in the fifth century AD or possibly earlier. It is based in the region of the historical Catalan County of Urgell, though it has different borders.  The seat and Cathedral of the bishop are situated in la Seu d'Urgell town. The state of Andorra is a part of this diocese.

Among its most notable events are Bishop Felix's adoptionist revolt, the coup of Bishop Esclua and the overthrowing of the bishop by members of aristocratic families (namely Salla i Ermengol del Conflent, Eribau i Folcs dels Cardona, Guillem Guifré de Cerdanya and Ot de Pallars) between the years 981 and 1122.

Also important is the diocese's patronage of Andorra, with the bishop holding the role of ex officio Co-Prince of Andorra jointly with the President of France (and formerly, the King of France). Andorra was ceded to the Bishop of Urgell by the Count Ermengol VI of Urgell in 1133.

Up to 1802, the ecclesiastical border corresponded with the royal one established under the Treaty of the Pyrenees in 1659. As such the 33 towns of the northern Cerdanya (now in France) came under the diocese's control.

Description of the diocesan territory
The Catholic Church controls the metropolitan church of Tarragona, with its see or capital of the Seu d'Urgell (Urgell See). It contains 7630 km2 and a population of 200,761 according to the 2000 census and is the largest bishopric of the eight that have a see in Catalonia. In contrast, it is the most sparsely populated. The diocese borders the bishoprics of Vic, Solsona, Lleida, Barbastro-Monzón, Toulouse, Pamiers and Perpignan. It has been deeply linked for many years to the regions that constituted the counties of Urgell, Pallars and Cerdanya during the Middle Ages, with which it identifies and forms a historical and geographic unit maintained up to the present day. The diocese totally or partially occupies the Ripollès, Cerdanya, Alt Urgell, Segarra, Urgell, Pla d'Urgell, Noguera, Pallars Jussà, Pallars Sobirà, Alta Ribagorça, Andorra, and the Vall d'Aran regions.

The bishopric's jurisdiction extends to 408 parishes, although today some have a very reduced population. Almost all of the parishes come from distant times, as the very titular saints of their churches. The most common are Saint Mary (in 90 parochial churches, as well as the cathedral), Saint Peter (35), Saint Martin (29), Saint Saturninus (24), Saint Steven (23), Saint Michael (19), Saint Andrew (17), Saint Julian (12), Saint Eulalia (11), Saint Vincent and Saint Felix (10). Many churches of the bishopric, parochial or not, conserve elements of great architectural interest, and thirty-six of them are considered cultural goods of national interest in Spain.

Amongst all Catalan bishoprics, the Diocese of Urgell has been that which has experienced the most border-related changes throughout its existence, mainly for political reasons: the loss of Ribagorça (9th century), to the benefit of the Diocese of Roda, and the cession of 144 parishes of the Berguedà, the Solsonès and a part of the Segarra, to the benefit of the new diocese of Solsona (1593-1623); later, it was necessary to adapt the territory to the borders between states, and thus in 1803, the 24 parishes of French Cerdagne, which had been ceded to France from the Treaty of the Pyrenees in 1659, also passed ecclesiastically to that country; and in 1804, the 28 from the Aran Valley, a territory circumscribed by France yet united fully to the Catalan-Aragonese territories at least since the 12th century, were annexed to the diocese of Urgell, coming from the eliminated Gascon diocese of Saint-Bertrand-de-Comminges. In 1874 the sixty-odd towns that formed the erstwhile exempt jurisdictions of Gerri de la Sal, Mur, Montodó-Bonrepòs, the order of Saint John of Jerusalem and Meià were annexed to the diocese. Finally, in 1956, the diocese gained the seven parishes of the Artesa de Segre enclave and gave up the 19 of the Franja de Ponent [Western Strip] to Lleida and Barbastre, grouped into three enclaves.

Origin of the Urgell diocese

The diocese, without excluding the possibility of a more remote origin, was already constituted at the beginning of the 6th century. The first known bishop, Saint Justus, figures among the participants of the councils of Toledo (531), Lleida and Valencia (546). His successors also took part regularly in the Toledo councils celebrated throughout the 7th century. The Episcopal succession, despite the uncertainty of names and chronology, seems to not be interrupted by the Saracen invasion of 714.

Monasticism must have been introduced into the diocese during the Visigothic period. The monasteries of Tavèrnoles, Gerri, Codinet, and Tresponts are probably anterior to the Saracen invasion. These foundations and the later ones--la Vedella, Elins, Bagà, la Portella, les Maleses, Villanega, Oveix, Bellera, el Burgal, Lavaix, Alaó, Escales, Ovarra, Taverna, Gualter, etc.—often adopted the Benedictine observance from the 9th century on, following the example of the majority of the coenobitic monasteries then extant in the Marca Hispanica. This became the norm for monastic life in the following century. These monasteries, alongside the parochial and canonical organization (the Urgell Diocese, Solsona, Cardona, Organyà, Ponts, Ager, Mur, Tremp) would greatly influence the Christianization of the country and its human, cultural and economic development.

The canonical monasteries derived into colleges as a result of their secularization (1592), and due to their corruption, the 1851 concord eliminated them, along with the other preexisting ones (Castellbò, Guissona, Balaguer). Mur and Àger were without a doubt the most famous Catalan canonical colleges, exempt from episcopal jurisdiction

Early Middle Ages

On the first decade of the Umayyad conquest of Hispania, Berber troops set up garrisons on the northernmost hilly regions and towns. Uthman ibn Naissa settled down in Cerdanya, killed the bishop of Urgell, and rebelled against central Cordovan rule in 730. The Berber lord was killed in 731, and the region subdued by Abd al-Rahman al-Ghafiqi.

During the episcopacy of the Bishop Felix (781–799), who was accused of adoptionism by the Carolingian theologians and for this motive deposed and confined to Lyon, the city of Urgell and its church were completely destroyed by the Arabs around 793. With the founding of the Marca Hispanica, the diocese, like the others recently restored, became part of the ecclesiastical province of Narbonne until the recreation of the metropolitan see of Tarragona in 1091. The Frankish kings intervened effectively in the country's reconstruction, promoting the Reconquest laying the foundations of its government. The territory now being free, mainly, from the Moors' power, with the help of the first Catalan Counts, they promoted the construction of a new cathedral, completed in the second part of the 9th century, to which were assigned 289 towns or villages—all the northwestern area of the Pyrenees.

At the same time, the Urgell church, ruled for more than two centuries (914-1122) by members of the Counts' families, fully entered the ring of the feudal system, which allowed it to shape for itself an extensive seigniorial patrimony, which among other cities and territories included the city of Urgell, the valleys of Andorra, the Vall de la Llosa, the Vall d'Arques and the Ribera Salada, the villages of Sanaüja, Guissona, and, from 1257 onwards, Tremp. This, however, forced it into a certain dependence on the superior power of the Counts. Also, the Gregorian Reform, introduced to the County of Urgell during the last years of the 11th century, preceded by the change of the Visigothic rite for the Roman rite, reduced those interventions of the laymen in ecclesiastical affairs and achieved the complete freedom of the Church in the spiritual and temporal domains. Moreover, the maintenance of those possessions originated constant tension and fighting throughout the Middle Ages with the Viscounts of Castellbó and his heirs, the Counts of Foix.

List of Bishops of Urgell

1 During a sede vacante.

See also
 List of Co-Princes of Andorra

References

External links
 Website of the Diocese of Urgell

Roman Catholic dioceses in Catalonia
 
Catholic Church in Andorra
La Seu d'Urgell